WZTU (94.9 FM) is a radio station in the Miami-Ft. Lauderdale radio market. Owned and operated by iHeartMedia, its studios are located in iHeartMedia complex in Rivera Blvd in Miramar and the transmitter site is in Miami Gardens. The station plays a Spanish top-40 format, mixed with some English top 40 songs.

WZTU is licensed by the FCC to broadcast in the HD Radio (hybrid) format.

History
WQAM-FM signed on the air in 1947, owned by the Miami Herald. It was a full-time simulcast with WQAM. In 1957, when Storz Broadcasting purchased WQAM, the FM signal was taken off the air, and the license returned to the Federal Communications Commission (FCC), as Storz was not interested in FM at that time.

A new station went on the air in 1962, with 81,000 watts under the WAEZ calls. It was the first station in Miami to broadcast continuously in stereo. It played easy listening music "from the beautiful Deauville Hotel in Miami Beach." The station was owned by Arthur E. Zucker, hence the "AEZ" in the station's calls. In 1969 it changed its calls to WOCN-FM to reflect its sister station WOCN, which it was now partially simulcasting. It continued to play its format, and even began an attempt at Spanish language romance music. For a brief moment during the mid-1970s, they were known as "Stereo 94".

In 1975, it became WINZ-FM under Guy Gannett Broadcasting, and went to a progressive rock format, with the moniker "Zeta-4" until early 1981, when it flipped to CHR/Pop station "I-95", retaining the WINZ-FM calls. "I-95" is Miami's dominant affiliate for Dan Ingram's Top 40 Satellite Survey. "I-95" provided for a highly competitive rating battle against Top 40 powerhouse WHYI during its few years of existence, becoming #1 in the Miami ARB. In early 1986, WINZ-FM transformed from Top-40 to a short-lived classic rock and adult hits hybrid as "Rockin' With Class....95-INZ".  This lasted for about a year until early 1987 when the station flipped to classic rock as Zeta, this time with the WZTA call letters. This is where the station would begin a long term commitment as a rocker. In the early 1990s, the station was purchased by Paxson Communications and then swallowed up by Clear Channel Communications (now iHeartMedia) in the mid 1990s. Under Paxson, the station evolved to an active rock format, still retaining the WZTA calls. In the early new millennium, Zeta attempted an alternative rock format, but switched back to the active rock format in 2004. With ratings continuing to slump, and Lex and Terry underperforming, Zeta finally came to an end on February 10, 2005 after 19 years as a rock station.

Mega 94.9 was born, with the new calls WMGE, which previously existed in Miami-Ft. Lauderdale on what is now urban WMIB, also under the Clear Channel umbrella. The station was part of Clear Channel's effort to expand its Hispanic radio efforts, as they were flipping several more stations to Spanish formats the same year under the leadership of Alfredo Alonso. Coincidentally, with no more active rock stations in the market, Cox Radio flipped their CHR-dance station Party 93.1 to active rocker 93Rock, with new calls WHDR, on February 14, 2005. Like other Hispanic urban formatted stations, Mega was a hybrid of both English and Spanish language.

The new Mega 94.9 continued to lose a listening base and failed to improve beyond its old rock format after two years on the air, and the station was adjusted to a Hispanic top 40 format in 2007.

On September 9, 2016, WMGE rebranded as "Tú 94.9." The station changed its call sign to the current WZTU on September 16, 2016.

References

External links
WZTU website

ZTU
Latin rhythmic radio stations
IHeartMedia radio stations
Radio stations established in 1962
Contemporary hit radio stations in the United States
1962 establishments in Florida